DCLS may refer to:
Doctor Clinical Laboratory Science
 Direct Current Level Shift, a modulation type in the IRIG timecode system
  Dauphin County Library System, in Dauphin County, Pennsylvania
 Doctorate of Clinical Laboratory Science.  The DCLS is an advanced professional doctorate designed for practicing CLSs who wish to further their level of clinical expertise and to develop leadership and management skills